Viking One, Viking 1, Viking I, or variant, may refer to:

 Viking 1 (1975-1982) NASA space probe to Mars
 Viking I (rocket), a 1949 U.S. NRL sounding rocket mission
 Société Européenne de Propulsion Viking 1 (rocket engine), the first version of the Viking (rocket engine)
  (1970-2002) roll-on--roll-off car and passenger ferry, called "Viking 1" (1970-1982)
  (1964-2008) roll-on--roll-off passenger and car ferry
 Empire Viking I, the Empire Ship named "Viking I", see List of Empire ships (U–Z)
 Viking Aircraft Viking I, a powered parachute maded by Viking Aircraft, introduced in 2000
 Vickers VC.1 Viking 1, a variant of the WW2 airliner Vickers VC.1 Viking
 Vickers Viking I, the name of the first production aircraft of the WW1 amphibious plane Vickers Viking
 Vikings (season 1), 2013 TV season of Vikings TV series
 Vikings episode 1 "Rites of Passage", see List of Vikings episodes

See also
 Viking (disambiguation)

Disambiguation pages